Meshkin Dasht, also Romanized as Meshkīn Dasht, is a city in Meshkin Dasht District of Fardis County, Alborz province, Iran. The city had a population at the 2006 census of 43,696 in 11,171 households, at which time it was among the six cities of the Central District of Karaj County, Tehran province, at that time. At the latest census in 2016, the population had risen to 62,005 in 18,644 households, about a third the size of Fardis and the only other city in the county, by which time the county was in Alborz province.

References 

Fardis County

Cities in Alborz Province

Populated places in Alborz Province

Populated places in Fardis County